Vlad Neculau (born 7 January 1998) is a Romanian rugby union player. He plays as a flanker for professional SuperLiga club Timișoara Saracens.

Club career
Vlad Neculau started playing rugby as a youth for a school based local Romanian club, CSS Unirea Iași, in Iași. After two years he joined the youth ranks of Timișoara Saracens, followed by his professional debut in 2017 for the same club.

International career
Neculau is also selected for Romania's national team, the Oaks, making his international debut during the Week 5 of 2019 Rugby Europe Championship in a match against the Zwarte Duivels / Diables Noirs on 17 March 2019.

References

External links

 Vlad Neculau at Timișoara Saracens website

1998 births
Living people
People from Iași County
Romanian rugby union players
Romania international rugby union players
SCM Rugby Timișoara players
Rugby union flankers